The Five Stars is a family pop band who has recorded many albums of well known and original Samoan and pacific songs. The reference of "Five Stars" in the band's name denotes the five stars on the national flag of Samoa. With more than 18 albums in production, they sit alongside Punialava’a and Tiama’a as some of the Pacific's most well known bands.

History
Formed in 1974, in Auckland, New Zealand, the Five Stars were mainly a family outfit. They consisted of brothers Alofa and Solomona (Soloman) Tu'uga and their relatives Samu Poulava-Selesele, Faifua Fa'atoe and Uili Misa. They were also initially managed by Afoa Tu'uga, who was the father of Alofa and Solomona Tu'uga. They were Hibiscus Records most prolific recording artists and during their career they released nine albums on vinyl LP and compact cassette and received two awards. One was a Gold Discs award and in 1986 the other was a New Zealand Music Award. In the 1990s most or all of their LP catalogue was released on compact disc.

In April 2006, band leader, Alofa Tuuga Stevenson died in Brisbane, Australia.

A current version of the band continues as The Five Star Band with some remaining members and their family members.

Line up
Samu Poulava-Selesele - (lead vocals)
Alofa Tu'uga aka Alofa Tu'uga Stevenson - (lead guitar, died 18 April 2006)
Uili Misa - (bass guitar)
Faifua Fa'atoe - (rhythm guitar)
Solomona Tu'uga aka Solomona Stevenson - (drums)

Other members
Steve Reupena-Stevenson (bass, guitar, drums, percussion).
Ross Uele
Sam Poulava-Selesele
Willie Misa
Sam Faifua Faatoe (died 30 July 2011)

Achievements

Platinum discs

 Samoan Style
 Samoa Matalasi

Gold discs 

 Popular Songs of Samoa
 Samoa with love
 Welcome to Samoa
 Pua Samoa
 Live at the Rainmaker Hotel
 Musika Malie
 Children of Polynesia
 Flower of Samoa

LP Releases
 Popular songs of Samoa, Hibiscus records  HLS-84 - (1980)
 Fetu e Lima, Hibiscus Records HLS-87 - (1981)

CD releases

The Five Stars
 Samoan Style (Popular Songs of Samoa), HLS-084, (1990)
 Samoa Matalasi - (My Beautiful Samoa), HLS-087
 Live At The Rainmaker Hotel, HLS-090
 Samoa With Love, HLS-092
 Welcome to Samoa, HLS-094, (1995)
 Musika Malie (Good Music), HLS-097
 Flower of Samoa Matou, HLS-108, (1998)
 The Five Stars Collection Vol 1(Popular Songs of Samoa), HLS-132
 The Five Stars Collection Vol 2, (Popular Songs of Samoa), HLS-158, (1994)
 The Five Stars Collection Vol 3, (Popular Songs of Samoa), HLS-160, (1996)
 Siva Mai, HLS-175, (1998)
 Lalelei pea oe Samoa, HKLS-180

Meiona with The Five Stars
 I Love You, HLS-143

Alofa
 Alofa, HLS-199

References

External links
Samoan catalogue, www.kiwipacific.com

Samoan music
Hibiscus Records artists
Musical groups established in 1974